American social dancing has changed a lot through the decades. Social dance is a "classification of dance styles, where sociability and socializing are the primary focus". Some social dances include: ballroom dance, folk dance, square dance, line dance, and even club dancing. These are meant to be fun, and are not intended as competition or performance dances. Social dances reflect the period and culture in which they were originally created. The music involved with each type of dance is also crucial to the style of dance. For example, swing dancing is typically done to big band music, while jazz dance was done to jazz music.

Background 
The 20th century brought about a change in social dances. The "old fashioned and out of step" dances such as "the waltz and polka" needed to make way "for something different and new". In the past, only upper class dances had been recorded because lower class dances were "not deemed worthy of record". However, now in the 20th century, "the Industrial Age was upon us, a new middle class was emerging and great social ... innovations were on the horizon". The upper class even became more accepting of dance music that began in lower classes. An example of this is ragtime dance and music. Ragtime had a "lively, infectious new sound". Some other forms of dancing that made a huge impact were jazz and swing dance. These dances are both energetic and had their own personality and culture. Jazz was danced to jazz music and swing was danced to big band music.

Importance in society 
Social dance plays a significant role in our society because it brings people together in a way that nothing else does. Social dancing is just that - social. Its purpose is not for competition or for performance.  It is fun and is part of culture and society. It serves "as the social center" and "the artistic release" in society. It is assumed "that dance will survive as long as it satisfies a contemporary social need and" beauty.

Connection to today 
There are many dancing styles of the past that are hardly used anymore. Styles from the 18th and 19th century such as the waltz and polka have practically disappeared from dance culture. Although many dances are not used anymore, there are some people that continue to enjoy dancing dated dances such as swing. Styles from the 20th century such as swing dancing are still done, but are not necessarily well known or popular.

Start of the century 
Ragtime and jazz dance were both iconic dances of the 20th century. Both of them contained syncopated rhythms and dance steps that were very different from the polite and proper dance steps from centuries before. The new technology that came with the century made way for new ways of thinking, which in turn brought new music and exciting new dances.

Ragtime dance 
Ragtime music was at the height of its popularity from 1895 to 1918. Soon there were also dance moves created to go along with the music. Ragtime "appeared, fresh and new, [and] its syncopate sounds quickly became popular". "Scott Joplin [had his first album,] Maple Leaf Rag was published in 1898 ... [and] for two decades, Ragtime was almost the only new music composed in America". When ragtime music was created, the upper class originally was against it. They felt that it was "more suitable for the lower classes, but its lively, infectious new sound eventually won out and Ragtime music was in". Ragtime "produced a sound very different from the 19th Century ballroom music" and therefore became a popular social dance of the upper, middle, and lower classes. After 1917, ragtime became less popular as Jazz caught the public's attention.

Jazz dance 
Jazz dance was iconic to the beginning of the 20th century and beyond. Its evolution began on plantations by "Africans held captive in the United States". Jazz dance was "practiced among blacks in social settings like house parties, dives, honky tonks, and jook joints". It was also included in night clubs such as "the Cotton Club ... as well as in staged musicals… [such as] Shuffle Along... and Runnin’ Wild". Jazz attire included articles such as "hats, feather boas, pleated trousers, skirts, shorts, and dresses". Jazz dancers hold their bodies a certain way when they are dancing. "The center of gravity is lowered ... the torso is inclined forward ... the entire body is engaged, resulting in movement that is initiated almost entirely through syncopated foot actions". There are many instances in which vocalization are included in the dance, such as when dancers call out a dance move. Dancing to jazz requires a "’jazz state of mind’ ... [which is] a way of moving that is simultaneously energized and laid back".

Mid-20th century 
Swing dance had its connections to ragtime and jazz dance, which came before it, as well as rock and roll, which came after it. People studying these dance forms have noticed the similarities in certain swing moves that resemble dance moves from rock and roll.

Swing dance 
Swing dance became popular in the late 1920s and maintained its popularity into the 1940s and 1950s. It faded away "with the birth of rock ‘n’ roll, [then] reemerged in the 1990s". This was a form of self-expression. A swing ‘scene’ is a location in which social interactions, music and dancing happens. Big band music went hand in hand with swing dancing. The swing scene started out edgy and then eventually it merged with popular culture. This resulted in more social dancing and less striving for a unique edge as had happened before. Swing dance was unique from other dance forms in that it provided human touch. This aspect of the dance separated it from other dance forms in which touch is not involved. Swing dancers purposefully tried to "revitalize partner dancing and [reclaim] a vital form of social interaction based on closeness".

Rock and roll 
Rock and roll eventually "replaced jazz as the teenager’s dance music of choice". Rock and roll became more popular in the 1950s and 1960s. There were many similarities between this and jazz dance regarding various movements for dances. For example, there were "similarities in the foot actions of Sugar Foot from the 1920s and the Mashed Potato popular in the 1960s".

References 

Social dance
20th-century dance
Dance in the United States